Bel is an unincorporated community in Allen Parish, Louisiana, United States.

Unincorporated communities in Allen Parish, Louisiana
Unincorporated communities in Louisiana